Douglas Keith Carmody (16 February 1919 – 21 October 1977) was an Australian first-class cricketer who played during the 1940s and 1950s.
He was Western Australia's captain when they won their first ever Sheffield Shield and is credited as being the inventor of the 'umbrella field'.

Born in Mosman, Carmody started his career with New South Wales. He made his Sheffield Shield debut against Queensland in 1939/40, his only game before the competition was suspended because of the war. During World War II, Carmody joined the Royal Australian Air Force but continued playing cricket with the Australian Services team, touring England and India in 1945. Carmody was at one stage imprisoned at Stalag Luft III, having been shot down off the coast of Holland. He was eventually freed by the Russian army.

When the war ended he returned to Shield cricket for the 1946/47 season. The following summer he crossed to Western Australia who had just joined the competition and Carmody was appointed as their inaugural captain. Carmody made his highest first class score of 198 against South Australia in Perth during the season. They went on to win the competition in their first attempt and Carmody remained in charge until Ken Meuleman took over in 1956–57.

See also
 List of New South Wales representative cricketers
 List of Western Australia first-class cricketers

External links

Cricinfo profile

1919 births
1977 deaths
Australian Services cricketers
Royal Australian Air Force cricketers
New South Wales cricketers
Western Australia cricketers
Australian cricketers
Cricketers from Sydney
Royal Australian Air Force personnel of World War II
Royal Australian Air Force officers
Shot-down aviators
Stalag Luft III prisoners of World War II
Australian prisoners of war